Proiphys cunninghamii, the Moreton Bay lily, is a herb with a bulb to 5 cm in diameter. The habitat is rainforest and their margins, in eastern Australia. Flowering occurs around November to December. Normal seed development of this species has not been observed.

References

Flora of New South Wales
Flora of Queensland
Amaryllidoideae
Asparagales of Australia